Katol taluka is a taluka in Katol subdivision of Nagpur district in Maharashtra state, India.   It covers an area of 9,017 hectares, and as of 2001 had a population of 155,668, of whom 37,435 were urban dwellers, and 118,233 were rural. The administrative center of the taluka is the city of Katol.

History
In 1901 Katol taluka was one of four talukas in Nagpur district.  It covered 800 square miles and had a population of 162,588.

Panchayat villages
Katol taluka is divided into eighty-three panchayat villages, each of which oversees one or more villages. The panchayat villages are:

Notes

External links
 

Talukas in Maharashtra
Talukas in Nagpur district